Nicholas Lawrence Mevoli III (August 22, 1981 – November 17, 2013) was an American freediver who died while attempting to set an American record at the Vertical Blue competition at Dean's Blue Hole in the Bahamas.

Early life 
Mevoli was born in Dunedin, Florida, and lived in Williamsburg, Brooklyn, New York. He worked as a prop technician in the film and television industry in New York, including on The CW series Gossip Girl and the Comedy Central series Chappelle's Show. He was also an actor, technician and writer with Rising Sun Performance Company, and starred in the 2004 independent film Exist.

Mevoli began free-diving competitively in early 2012. He won titles twice at the Deja Blue competition and finished third at the Caribbean Cup in Roatán, Honduras. He achieved an American record in the Caribbean Cup on May 27, 2013, with a dive to 100 meters in the Constant Weight (CWT) category. He finished third in the Constant Weight Without Fins (CNF) category at the free-diving world championships in Greece in September 2013.

Death 

Mevoli returned to the surface after 3 minutes and 38 seconds underwater, but fell backward into the ocean and lost consciousness. Safety divers and the event physician attempted to revive Mevoli, whose pulse disappeared. After resuscitation efforts had continued for 90 minutes, he was transported to Vid Simms Memorial Health Center, reportedly suffering from pulmonary edema. Mevoli died at 1:44 p.m. He was the first athlete to die in an international free-diving competition.

The New York Times published a photograph of a visibly distressed Mevoli taken just after his return to the surface from his last dive and shortly before he lost consciousness. Some readers questioned the ethics of publishing the photograph.

References

External links
 
 

1981 births
2013 deaths
American freedivers
American male film actors
Respiratory disease deaths in the Bahamas
Deaths from pulmonary edema
Male actors from New York City
People from Dunedin, Florida
People from Williamsburg, Brooklyn
Sport deaths in the Bahamas
Sportspeople from Brooklyn
Sportspeople from Florida
Underwater diving deaths